Space Integrated GPS/INS (SIGI) is a strapdown Inertial Navigation Unit (INU) developed and built by Honeywell International to control and stabilize spacecraft during flight.

SIGI has integrated global positioning and inertial navigation technology to provide three navigation solutions : Pure inertial, GPS-only and blended GPS/INS.

Current and Future Usage
SIGI have been employed on the International Space Station, the Japanese H-II Transfer Vehicle (HTV) the Boeing X-37 and X-40.

SIGI is also proposed as the primary navigation system for Orion, which is scheduled to replace the Space Shuttle.

See also 

 Air navigation
 Spherical trigonometry
 Miniature Inertial Measurement Unit (MIMU)

References

External links
Relative Navigation and Attitude Determination Near the International Space Station

Avionics
Radio navigation
Navigational equipment
Spacecraft communication